Charieis is a genus of mantids in the family Tarachodidae. It is a monotypic genus with a single recognised species, Charieis peeli.

References

Further reading

 
 
 

Tarachodidae
Articles created by Qbugbot